Monocacy (Shawnee: Monnockkeseymay) may refer to the Monocacy River in Maryland, USA. 

Monocacy may also refer to:

Other streams
Little Monocacy River, a tributary of the Potomac River in Maryland
Monocacy Creek (Lehigh River tributary), a tributary of the Lehigh River in Pennsylvania
Monocacy Creek (Schuylkill River), a tributary of the Schuylkill River in Pennsylvania

Ships
USS Monocacy (1864), the first Monocacy, a gunboat launched in, and served until 1903
USS Monocacy (PG-20), the second Monocacy, commissioned in 1914 and decommissioned in 1939
USS Genesee (AT-55), originally the civilian tug Monocacy (1905)

Other
Monocacy Aqueduct, crosses the Monocacy River near its mouth
Monocacy National Battlefield, memorializing the Battle of Monocacy (1864), fought near the Monocacy River
Battle of Monocacy, the July 1864 Civil War battle
Monocacy (MARC station) named for the battlefield site
Monocacy Station, Pennsylvania, an unincorporated community in Berks County, Pennsylvania